Sarasara is a village in Badlapur, Jaunpur district, Uttar Pradesh, India.

Geography

It has an average elevation of 82 metres. It has been assigned 222141 pincode by Indian postal services.

Demographics
As of the 2011 Indian census, Sarsara had a population of 841.

References

Villages in Jaunpur district